Lova Moor (born Marie-Claude Jourdain; 5 March 1946) is a French dancer and singer.

Biography
Lova Moor was born in La Grève-sur-Mignon, Charente-Maritime. She began her career as a nude dancer. Hired by Alain Bernardin at the Crazy Horse Saloon, she quickly reached notoriety by becoming leader of the troupe and by marrying her employer, who died in 1994. Beginning in 1995 she also had a brief relationship with French playboy Constantin Djirjirian. 

In 1986, she released her debut single, "Tendresse SOS" which passed unnoticed, then "Et je danse" in 1988 which hit No. 9 on the French SNEP Singles Chart. Her next singles, "Je m'en balance" (1989), "Danse encore" (1990), "My Life" (1991), "Jealous" (1992), "As You Want" (1993), "Ma Géographie" (1993), "Oh les mecs" (1997) and "Batucada" (1998). A compilation containing another song "C'est vrai" was released in 2003 by Yvon Chataigner. She appeared in three films : Crazy Horse de Paris (Alain Bernardin, 1977), Saturday, Sunday and Friday (Castellano & Pipolo, 1979) and Le Tronc (Bernard Faroux and Karl Zéro, 1992).

Discography

References

French female erotic dancers
People from Charente-Maritime
1946 births
Living people
Moor, Lova